Virginia Dale is a tiny unincorporated community located in northwestern Larimer County, Colorado, United States.  Virginia Dale is situated in the foothills of the Rocky Mountains on U.S. Highway 287, approximately  45 mi (72 km) northwest of Ft. Collins and approximately 4 mi (6 km) south of the Wyoming border. In the late 19th century, Virginia Dale was a famous stop on the Overland Trail. The stage station, the last of its kind still standing, and its associated home, the Hurzeler House, are owned and maintained by the Virginia Dale Community Club.

Overland Trail stage station
The Virginia Dale stage station was established in 1862 by Jack Slade, former station manager at Julesburg, Colorado where he famously got into a dispute with Jules Beni. Beni had previously shot Slade five times but Slade survived and exacted his revenge by ambushing Beni, tying him to a fencepost and shooting off his fingers before delivering a coup de grace to the head. Slade kept Beni's ears as trophies. While station master in Julesburg, Slade met and breakfasted with Samuel Clemens, "Mark Twain" and made quite an impression upon Twain. Twain wrote about his encounter with Slade in his 1872 publication "Roughing It".

When Ben Holladay took over the Overland Stage in 1862, he changed the route, taking it south from Julesberg along the South Platte River to Greeley and then up the old Cherokee Trail through Latham, LaPorte, Virginia Dale, Colorado, and into Wyoming.

Virginia Dale was a "home station" on the Overland Trail, meaning that passengers could disembark, get a meal, and stay overnight in a hotel if the stage was delayed by weather or nightfall. Thirty to fifty horses were kept at the station which was located in a pleasant, grassy glade (or "dale") along a clear bubbling stream, later named Dale Creek. Slade probably named the post after his wife Virginia, whose maiden name might have been "Dale". Slade was an excellent stage manager as long as he stayed sober. Many stories credit him with outrageous actions from shooting up a saloon in LaPorte for serving his stage drivers whiskey, or for having "a fondness of shooting canned goods off grocery store shelves"  to robbing the stage of $60,000 in gold, which later disappeared. Slade was fired as stage manager in November, 1862 after a drunken shooting spree at nearby Fort Halleck and left with his wife for Virginia City, Montana where he was hanged in early 1864 by angry miners.

The Virginia Dale stage station hosted many famous travelers such as author Albert D. Richardson ("Beyond the Mississippi") and an Illinois governor, probably Richard Yates. Samuel Bowles, editor of the Massachusetts Republican wrote in 1865, 
"Virginia Dale deserves its pretty name. A pearly, lively-looking stream runs through a beautiful basin of perhaps one hundred acres, among the mountains - for we are within the entrances of one of the great hills-stretching away in smooth and rising pasture to nooks and crannies of the wooded range; fronted by rock embankment, and flanked by the snowy peaks themselves; warm with the June sun, and rare with an air into which no fetid breath has poured itself-it is difficult to imagine a loveable spot in  Nature's kingdom."  
The station itself was built with timber cut by Hiram 'Hi" Kelly, one of the first profitable cattle ranchers in the Laramie area.

In 1865 future Vice President Schuyler Colfax (then Speaker of the US House of Representatives) was detained at the post by Native American raids. It is possible that Virginia Dale served briefly as a telegraph station.

Settlement
After the construction of the Union Pacific Railroad in 1867, the stage stop was abandoned. Settlers began moving into the area in 1872, establishing the first school in 1874.  The first church was built in 1880. The community was formerly the site of a post office and cafe along Highway 287 until the 1990s, when the cafe and post office were shut down.  The area continues to be a region of cattle ranching. The original 1874 school still stands along U.S. Highway 287 and the original stage station still stands a short distance east of the highway.  The U.S. Post Office at Livermore (ZIP Code 80536) now serves Virginia Dale postal addresses.

Historical marker 

The settlement is memorialized by a bronze plaque just off U.S. 287 on the easterly side (about a mile north of the school and a few hundred yards north of the abandoned post office). The plaque reads as follows:
 THIS MEMORIAL IS THE PROPERTY OF THE STATE OF COLORADO.
 ---
 THREE-QUARTERS OF A MILE NORTHWEST FROM THIS POINT IS THE ORIGINAL VIRGINIA DALE. FAMOUS STAGE STATION ON THE OVERLAND ROUTE TO CALIFORNIA, 1862-1867. ESTABLISHED BY JOSEPH A. (JACK) SLADE AND NAMED FOR HIS WIFE, VIRGINIA. LOCATED ON THE CHEROKEE TRAIL OF 1849. FAVORITE CAMP GROUND FOR EMIGRANTS. VICE PRESIDENT COLFAX AND PARTY WERE DETAINED HERE BY INDIAN RAIDS IN 1865. ROBERT J. SPOTSWOOD REPLACED SLADE.
 ---
 ERECTED BY THE STATE HISTORICAL SOCIETY OF COLORADO FROM THE MRS. J. N. HALL FOUNDATION AND BY THE FORT COLLINS PIONEER SOCIETY, 1935.

Climate

According to the Köppen Climate Classification system, Virginia Dale has a warm-summer humid continental climate, abbreviated "Dfb" on climate maps.

References 

 Dan Rottenberg, 2008, The Death of a Gunfighter: The Quest for Jack Slade, the West's Most Elusive Legend, Westholme Publishing, LLC, Yardley PA, .
On pages 252-253 can be found a description of Slade's construction of Virginia Dale; p. 253 offers of a photo taken in 1870. Slade's decline into drunken escapades in Denver and Laporte (60 miles north of Denver) led to his replacement by Robert Spotswood, an Overland Stage Company official. Spotswood replaced Slade with Lem Flowers at Virginia Dale—Flowers would then cover what had been Slade's Denver - LaPorte - Virginia Dale inspection route; cf Chapter 15 "The Breaking Point" pages 263-275.

External links
 The Overland Trail: Virginia Dale
 Ghosttowns.com: Virginia Dale
 Pictures of the Virginia Dale Stage Station.
 1866 description of spending the night at Virginia Dale

Former populated places in Larimer County, Colorado
Ghost towns in Colorado
History of Colorado
1862 establishments in Colorado Territory